The Hong Kong national under-20 rugby union team is Hong Kong's junior national team. The 2014 IRB Junior World Rugby Trophy was their first appearance at a national level, they placed 8th overall.

Hong Kong defeated Korea 58-7 in the 2014 Asian Under 19 Championship final to qualify for the 2015 World Rugby Under 20 Trophy in Lisbon, Portugal.

Current squad
Hong Kong U20 squad to the 2015 Under 20 Trophy:
Aiden Bradley (USRC Tigers)
Thomas Cheung (City RFC)
Hugo Chui (HKFC)
Ian Chan (USRC Tigers)
James Christie (Newcastle RFC)
Daniel Davidson (Tigers)
Joshua Davies (Tigers)
Kenneth Encarnacion (Gai Wu)
Finley Field (Edinburgh Uni)
Kevin Field (Edinburgh Uni)
Li Tsz Hin (Tin Shui Wai)
Tomos Howells (Tigers)
Calvin Hunter (Tigers)
Eric Kwok (Tigers)
Sjors Laurijsen (HK Scottish)
Richard Lewis (HKFC)
Callum McFeat-Smith (HKFC)
John William Markley (Valley)
Raef Morrison (co-captain, Edinburgh Uni)
Alessandro Nardoni (HK Scottish)
Liam Owens (Valley)
Alexander Post (HK Cricket Club)
Ron Siew (Tigers)
Cameron Smith (HKFC)
Hugo Stiles (co-captain, Valley)
Kyle Sullivan (Tonbridge Juddians RFC)
Cheuk Hang Tang (Tin Shui Wai)

Previous Squads

References

Under20
National under-20 rugby union teams